The federal subjects of Russia, also referred to as the subjects of the Russian Federation or simply as the subjects of the federation, are the constituent entities of Russia, its top-level political divisions according to the Constitution of Russia. Kaliningrad Oblast is the only federal subject geographically separated from the rest of the Russian Federation by other countries.

According to the Russian Constitution, the Russian Federation consists of republics, krais, oblasts, cities of federal importance, an autonomous oblast and autonomous okrugs, all of which are equal subjects of the Russian Federation. Three Russian cities of federal importance (Moscow, Saint Petersburg, and Sevastopol) have a status of both city and separate federal subject which comprises other cities and towns (Zelenograd, Troitsk, Kronstadt, Kolpino, etc.) within each federal city—keeping older structures of postal addresses. In 1993, the Russian Federation comprised 89 federal subjects. By 2008 the number of federal subjects had decreased to 83 because of several mergers. In 2014 after being annexed from Ukraine, Sevastopol and the Republic of Crimea were announced as the 84th and 85th federal subjects of Russia, a move that was internationally unrecognized. During the 2022 Russian invasion of Ukraine, four Ukrainian oblasts were annexed by Russia, though they remain internationally recognized as part of Ukraine and are only partially occupied by Russia.

Every federal subject has its own head, a parliament, and a constitutional court. Each federal subject has its own constitution or charter and legislation, although the authority of these organs differ. Subjects have equal rights in relations with federal government bodies. The federal subjects have equal representation—two delegates each—in the Federation Council, the upper house of the Federal Assembly. They do, however, differ in the degree of autonomy they enjoy; republics are offered more autonomy.

Post-Soviet Russia formed during the history of the Russian Soviet Federative Socialist Republic within the USSR and did not change at the time of the dissolution of the Soviet Union in 1991. In 1992, during so-called "parade of sovereignties", separatist sentiments and the War of Laws within Russia, the Russian regions signed the Federation Treaty ( Federativny dogovor), establishing and regulating the current inner composition of Russia, based on the division of authorities and powers among Russian government bodies and government bodies of constituent entities. The Federation Treaty was included in the text of the 1978 Constitution of the Russian SFSR. The current Constitution of Russia, adopted by national referendum on 12 December 1993, came into force on 25 December 1993 and abolished the model of the Soviet system of government introduced in 1918 by Vladimir Lenin and based on the right to secede from the country and on unlimited sovereignty of federal subjects (in practice secession was never allowed), which conflicts with the country's integrity and federal laws. The new constitution eliminated a number of legal conflicts, reserved the rights of the regions, introduced local self-government and did not grant the Soviet-era right to secede from the country. In the late 1990s and early 2000s the political system became de jure closer to other modern federal states with a republican form of government in the world. In the 2000s, following the policies of Vladimir Putin and of the ruling United Russia party, the Russian parliament changed the distribution of tax revenues, reduced the number of elections in the regions and gave more power to the federal authorities.

Terminology
An official government translation of the constitution of Russia from Russian to English uses the term "constituent entities of the Russian Federation". For example, Article 5 reads: "The Russian Federation shall consist of republics, krays, oblasts, cities of federal significance, an autonomous oblast and autonomous okrugs, which shall have equal rights as constituent entities of the Russian Federation." A translation provided by Garant-Internet instead uses the term "subjects of the Russian Federation".

Tom Fennell, a translator, told the 2008 American Translators Association conference that "constituent entity of the Russian Federation" is a better translation than "subject". This was supported by Tamara Nekrasova, Head of Translation Department at Goltsblat BLP, saying in a 2011 presentation at a translators conference that "constituent entity of the Russian Federation is more appropriate than subject of the Russian Federation (subject would be OK for a monarchy)".

Types

Each federal subject belongs to one of the following types.

List

Notes 

a.  The largest city is also listed when it is different from the capital/administrative centre.

b.  According to Article 13 of the Charter of Leningrad Oblast, the governing bodies of the oblast are located in the city of St. Petersburg. However, St. Petersburg is not officially the administrative centre of the oblast.

c.  According to Article 24 of the Charter of Moscow Oblast, the governing bodies of the oblast are located in the city of Moscow and throughout the territory of Moscow Oblast. However, Moscow is not officially the administrative centre of the oblast.

d.  Internationally recognized as a part of Ukraine.

e.  In February 2000, the former code of 20 for the Chechen Republic was cancelled and replaced with code 95. License plate production was suspended due to the Chechen Wars, causing numerous issues, which in turn forced the region to use a new code.

f.  Claimed, but only partially controlled by Russia.

g.  As Russia only partially controls the region, this is a claimed figure.

Statistics of federal subjects
List of federal subjects of Russia by GRP
Armorial of Russia (Coat of arms of Russian federal subjects)
List of federal subjects of Russia by incidence of substance abuse
List of federal subjects of Russia by GDP per capita
List of federal subjects of Russia by murder rate
List of federal subjects of Russia by life expectancy
List of federal subjects of Russia by population
List of federal subjects of Russia by total fertility rate
List of federal subjects of Russia by Human Development Index
List of federal subjects of Russia by unemployment rate
Regional parliaments of Russia
List of current heads of federal subjects of Russia
Forest cover by federal subject in Russia
ISO 3166-2:RU

Mergers, splits and internal territorial changes 

Starting in 2005, some of the federal subjects were merged into larger territories. In this process, six very sparsely populated subjects (comprising in total 0.3% of the population of Russia) were integrated into more populated subjects, with the hope that the economic development of those territories would benefit from the much larger means of their neighbours. The merging process was finished on 1 March 2008. No new mergers have been planned since March 2008. The six territories became "administrative-territorial regions with special status". They have large proportions of minorities, with Russians being a majority only in three of them. Four of those territories have a second official language in addition to Russian: Buryat (in two of the merged territories), Komi-Permian, Koryak. This is an exception: all the other official languages of Russia (other than Russian) are set by the Constitutions of its constituent Republics (Mordovia, Chechnya, Dagestan etc.). The status of the "administrative-territorial regions with special status" has been a subject of criticism because it does not appear in the Constitution of the Russian Federation.

In addition to those six territories that entirely ceased to be subjects of the Russian Federation and were downgraded to territories with special status, another three subjects have a status of subject but are simultaneously part of a more populated subject:
 Nenets Autonomous Okrug (2010 population of 42090) is a subject since 1993, but is also, according to its Constitution, a part of Arkhangelsk Oblast
Khanty-Mansi Autonomous Okrug obtained autonomy in 1977, but is simultaneously part of Tyumen Oblast
Yamalo-Nenets Autonomous Okrug obtained the status of subject in 1992 (after obtaining autonomy in 1977), but is also part of Tyumen Oblast.
With an estimated population of 49348 as of 2018, Chukotka is currently the least populated subject of Russia that is not part of a more populated subject. It was separated from Magadan Oblast in 1993. Chukotka is one of the richest subjects of Russia (with a Gross Regional Product [GRP] per capita equivalent to that of Australia) and therefore does not fit in the pattern of merging a subject to benefit from the economic dynamism of the neighbour.

In 1992, Ingushetia separated from Chechnya, both to stay away from the growing violence in Chechnya and as a bid to obtain the Eastern part of Northern Ossetia (it did not work: the Chechen conflict spread violence to Ingushetia, and North Ossetia retained its Prigorodny District). Those two Muslim republics, populated in vast majority (95%+) by closely related Vainakh people, speaking Vainakhish languages, remain the two poorest subjects of Russia, with the GRP per capita of Ingushetia being equivalent to that of Iraq. According to 2016 statistics, however, they are also the safest regions of Russia, and also have the lowest alcohol consumption, with alcohol poisoning at least 40 times lower than the national average.

Until 1994, Sokolsky District, Nizhny Novgorod Oblast was part of Ivanovo Oblast.

In 2011–2012, the territory of Moscow increased by 140% (to ) by acquiring part of Moscow Oblast.

On 13 May 2020, the governors of Arkhangelsk Oblast and Nenets Autonomous Okrug announced their plan to merge following the collapse of oil prices stemming from the COVID-19 pandemic. The process was scrapped on 2 July due to its unpopularity among the population.

See also
Subdivisions of Russia
Federal districts of Russia
Economic regions of Russia
History of the administrative division of Russia
Armorial of Russia
Republics of the Soviet Union
Flags of the Soviet Republics
Flags of the federal subjects of Russia
List of federal subjects of Russia by population
List of heads of federal subjects of Russia

References

Notes

Sources

 
Russia 1
First-level administrative divisions by country
 
Russian-speaking countries and territories
History of Russia (1991–present)